Luís Edmundo Pereira (born 21 June 1949) is a Brazilian former professional footballer who played as a centre back, in particular with S.E. Palmeiras, Atlético Madrid and the Brazil national team. He won national championships in both Brazil and Spain beyond UEFA and the Intercontinental Cup. Known for his pace and power, as well as his marking and defensive leadership, he was, for a time, considered one of the best defenders in Europe during his time with Atlético Madrid. While his defending style can be considered "classical," he is also considered the first and best of Brazil's "modern" centre back, a role that would go on to include World Cup winner Lúcio.

Career
Pereira received 36 caps with the Brazil national team, the first one in June 1973 and the last in July 1977, and played in the 1974 World Cup – where he was sent off in the second round match against Holland for a foul on Johan Neeskens. He became the first Brazilian player to receive a red card during a World Cup finals match.

Pereira played 562 games with Palmeiras (34 goals) and 171 games with Atlético Madrid (17 goals).

After retiring as player, he continued his involvement in football by becoming manager of São Bento and Sãocarlense, and assistant manager of São Caetano.

Since 2002 he lives in Madrid, Spain, with his wife and daughter and he is the President of the Atlético de Madrid B.

Honours
Palmeiras
Campeonato Paulista (São Paulo State championship): 1972 and 1974 
Campeonato Brasileiro Série A (Brazilian championship): 1969, 1972 and 1973

Atlético de Madrid
La Liga (Spanish championship): 1977 
Copa del Rey (Spanish Cup): 1976

References

External links

Gazeta Esportiva (in Portuguese)

1949 births
Living people
Brazilian footballers
Brazilian football managers
Campeonato Brasileiro Série A players
La Liga players
Sociedade Esportiva Palmeiras players
Atlético Madrid footballers
CR Flamengo footballers
Sport Club Corinthians Paulista players
Associação Desportiva São Caetano players
Esporte Clube Santo André players
Associação Portuguesa de Desportos players
Esporte Clube São Bento players
1974 FIFA World Cup players
1975 Copa América players
Brazil international footballers
Brazilian expatriate footballers
Expatriate footballers in Spain
Esporte Clube São Bento managers
Atlético Madrid B managers
People from Juazeiro
Association football defenders
Sportspeople from Bahia